Gleimia coleocanis is a bacterium from the genus of Gleimia which has been isolated from the vagina of a dog.

References

Actinomycetales
Bacteria described in 2002